Gulkhona is a village and jamoat in western Tajikistan. It is located in Jabbor Rasulov District in Sughd Region. The jamoat has a total population of 24,077 (2015). It consists of 11 villages, including Gulkhona (the seat) and Lolazor (formerly: Kayragach).

Name
Gulkhona in Persian means place of flowers. Gol means flower, Khana/Khona means place/house.

References

Populated places in Sughd Region
Jamoats of Tajikistan